Sonnet is a multilingual spell checker program in KDE Frameworks 5 and KDE Software Compilation 4. Sonnet replaced kspell2 that was created for KDE3. The two main goals for Sonnet's development were a simpler API, wider language support and performance. Notable improvements in Sonnet over kspell2 are

Automatic language detection, a language can be identified with as little as 20 characters of text. Even multiple languages in the same document can be detected and spell checked correctly
Better performance
Improvements in spell checking languages like Thai and Japanese
Simpler design, kspell2 consisted of 7 components and a complicated API. Sonnet is a single component and aims to provide a simpler API
The user can select a primary and backup dictionary, an example given was a doctor who frequently uses terms from a medical dictionary. Words that would not appear in a regular dictionary would be corrected by the backup dictionary that contains medical terms.

See also 
Enchant (software)

References

External links 

Article on Sonnet
Developers blog

Free spelling checking programs
KDE Frameworks
KDE Platform
Language software for Linux